The 2022–23 Princeton Tigers women's basketball team represents Princeton University during the 2022–23 NCAA Division I women's basketball season. The Tigers, led by fourth-year head coach Carla Berube, play their home games at Jadwin Gymnasium as members of the Ivy League. They finished the Ivy League season 12–2, winning a share of the championship alongside the Columbia Lions. The Tigers won the 2023 Ivy League women's basketball tournament, their fourth championship title, and earned an automatic bid to the 2023 NCAA Division I women's basketball tournament, the team's tenth appearance.

Previous season
The Tigers finished the season with a 25–5 overall record, 14–0 in Ivy League play to finish in first place and win the conference's regular season championship.  As the top seed in the Ivy League Tournament, they defeated Harvard and Columbia to win the championship.  They received an automatic bid to the NCAA tournament, where they were the eleventh seed in the Bridgeport Region.  They defeated Kentucky in the First Round before losing to Indiana to end their season.

Roster

Schedule
Source:

|-
!colspan=9 style=| Non-conference regular season

|-
!colspan=6 style=| Ivy League Tournament

|-
!colspan=6 style=| NCAA Tournament

Rankings

The Coaches Poll did not release a poll for the week of November 7.

References

Princeton
Princeton Tigers women's basketball seasons
Princeton Tigers women's
Princeton Tigers women's
Princeton